The 1964 Railway Cup Hurling Championship was the 38th staging of the Railway Cup since its establishment by the Gaelic Athletic Association in 1927. The cup began on 16 February 1964 and ended on 17 March 1964.

Munster were the defending champions.

On 17 March 1964, Leinster won the championship following a 3-07 to 2-09 defeat of Munster in the final. This was their 10th Railway Cup title and their first since 1962.

Leinster's Eddie Keher was the Railway Cup top scorer with 2-09.

Results

Semi-final

Final

Statistics

Scoring

Top scorers overall

Top scorers in a single game

Miscellaneous

 The Munster selectors dropped team captain Mick Flannelly from the panel after the semi-final. He was replaced as captain by Phil Grimes.

Bibliography

 Donegan, Des, The Complete Handbook of Gaelic Games (DBA Publications Limited, 2005).

References

Railway Cup Hurling Championship
1964 in hurling